"Casanova" is the sixth single by the Dutch girl group Luv', released in the spring of 1979 by Philips Records. This song appears on the formation's second album, Lots Of Luv', and was a Top 10 single in a large part of Continental Europe, maintaining Luv's position as the best Dutch export act of 1979.

Background
After the success of the hit singles U.O.Me, You're the Greatest Lover and Trojan Horse as well as the album With Luv' in 1978, Philips/Phonogram Records released in April 1979 the new single, "Casanova", as a foretaste of the Lots Of Luv' LP. Casanova's lyrics deal with an unfaithful man who can't help seducing women. The song's arrangements were inspired by Flamenco, Latin American music and 1970s Europop, making it a smash hit in Benelux, the German-speaking countries and Denmark. A Spanish version was recorded.

Commercial performance
"Casanova" was a Top 5 hit in Austria, Denmark, Switzerland and  Flanders (Belgium), a Top 10 single in the Netherlands and Germany as well as a Top 20 song in Spain.

According to a special issue of Billboard magazine about the German recording industry published on December 8th, 1979, the single sold 300.000 copies in the Federal Republic of Germany.

Track listing and release
7" Vinyl 

 a. "Casanova"
 b. "DJ"

Cover versions
 In 1979, the German female singer, Kirstin Lill, recorded a Schlager version in German entitled "Du bist ein Casanova".
 Orchester Kai Werner from Germany covered it in 1979.
 German singer Max Greger recorded his version of in 1979.
 Ady Zehnpfennig from Germany rendered it in 1979.
 French formation Guy Denys His Organ And His Orchestra performed a cover version in 1979.
 Belgian singer Frank Vlietinck covered the song in 1979.
 Pop/Disco artist, Mona Carita, sang the track (entitled "Voi Mikä Casanova!") in Finnish which was included on her 1979 eponymous album.
 Swiss band Claudius Alzner Und Seine Solisten covered the track for their compilation Cocktail International Vol. 17 in 1980.
 In 1980, Michael Schau Und Seine Wersi-Orgel from Germany recorded their version of the track.
 In 2006, Klaus Beyer recorded a German version of the song.
 In 2009, Flemish singer, Lindsay, performed the song in Dutch for her album De Mooiste Dag.

Charts

Weekly charts

Year-end charts

References

1979 singles
Luv' songs
Songs written by Hans van Hemert
Songs written by Piet Souer
1979 songs
Phonogram Records singles
Philips Records singles